The Rosemarkie sculpture fragments are the Pictish slabs and stone fragments other than the main Rosemarkie Stone which have been discovered in Rosemarkie, on the Black Isle of Easter Ross. There are fourteen in all. 

The so-called Daniel Stone is thought to depict the Old Testament story of Daniel in the Lion's Den. 

The stones are all of likely Christian origin, and share a similar style with the art of Iona. Some of them may have been of funerary purpose, as coffin lids, while others may have formed part of a larger stone. These stones are usually displayed in the Groam House Museum of Rosemarkie.

References
 Fraser, Iain, Ritchie, J.N.G., et al., Pictish Symbol Stones: An Illustrated Gazetteer, (Royal Commission on the Ancient and Historical Monuments of Scotland, 1999)

External links
 

Symbols on Pictish stones
Pictish stones in Highland (council area)
Black Isle

fr:Pierres Pictes de Ross